The Central District of Neyriz County is a district (bakhsh) in Neyriz County, Fars Province, Iran. At the 2006 census, its population was 52,097, in 13,649 families.  The District has one city: Neyriz. The District has two rural districts (dehestan): Horgan Rural District and Rostaq Rural District.

References 

Neyriz County
Districts of Fars Province